Cismon del Grappa is a town and comune in the province of Vicenza, Veneto, Italy. It is east of SS47 state road.

Twin towns
Cismon del Grappa is twinned with:

  Giarre, Italy, since 1969

References
(Google Maps)

Cities and towns in Veneto